The 14th Pan American Junior Athletics Championships were held in São Paulo, Brazil at the Estádio Ícaro de Castro Melo on July 6 to July 8, 2007.   A detailed report on the
results was given.

Participation (unofficial)
Detailed result lists can be found on the CACAC, on the CBAt, on the Tilastopaja, on the USA Track & Field, and on the "World Junior Athletics History"
website.  An unofficial count yields the number of about 432
athletes from about 34 countries:  
Anguilla (2), Argentina (20), Bahamas (12), Barbados (9), Bermuda (3), Bolivia
(2), Brazil (70), British Virgin Islands (1), Canada (45), Cayman Islands (3),
Chile (17), Colombia (28), Costa Rica (1), Cuba (9), Dominica (2), Dominican
Republic (3), Ecuador (17), El Salvador (3), Guatemala (5), Guyana (3),
Jamaica (22), Mexico (17), Netherlands Antilles (2), Panama (1), Paraguay (9),
Peru (7), Puerto Rico (8), Saint Kitts and Nevis (7), Saint Lucia (1),
Trinidad and Tobago (20), United States (60), Uruguay (2), U.S. Virgin Islands
(2), Venezuela (19).

Medal summary
Medal winners are published.
Complete results can be found on the CACAC website, on the CBAt website, on the USA Track & Field website, on the Tilastopaja website, and on the "World Junior Athletics History" website.

Men

Women

Medal table

The medal count has been published.

References

External links
World Junior Athletics History
Official results 

Pan American
Pan American
Pan American
Pan American U20 Athletics Championships
International athletics competitions hosted by Brazil
2007 in youth sport